On Broadway may refer to:

Film, television, and radio
 On Broadway (film), a 2007 American film directed by Dave McLaughlin
 "On Broadway" (Smash), a television episode
 On Broadway (Sirius XM), a satellite radio channel

Music
 "On Broadway" (song), by the Drifters, 1963; covered by George Benson, 1978
 On Broadway (David Campbell album), 2010
 On Broadway (Reuben Wilson album), 1968
 On Broadway (Vol. 1), an album by the Ten Tenors, 2014
 On Broadway: Act One – October 28th, 1987, an album by the Jerry Garcia Band and the Jerry Garcia Acoustic Band
 A series of five albums by Paul Motian:
 On Broadway Volume 1, 1989
 On Broadway Volume 2, 1989
 On Broadway Volume 3, 1993
 On Broadway Vol. 4 or The Paradox of Continuity, 2006
 On Broadway Volume 5, 2009
 King Crimson on Broadway, an album by King Crimson, 1999
 On Broadway, an album by Roger Whittaker, 1995
 On Broadway, an album by the Four Tops, 1967
 On Broadway, a soundtrack album from the television special G.I.T. on Broadway by Diana Ross & the Supremes and the Temptations, 1969
 Louis Prima & Keely Smith on Broadway, an album by Louis Prima and Keely Smith, 1958
 Louis Prima on Broadway, an album by Louis Prima, 1967

Other uses
 On Broadway, Inc., an American non-profit organization in Green Bay, Wisconsin, US
 On Broadway, a 1990 edition of Damon Runyon stories

See also
 Broadway theatre, theatrical performances associated with Broadway, New York City